Joonas Kokkonen (13 November 1921 – 2 October 1996) was a Finnish composer. He was one of the most internationally famous Finnish composers of the 20th century after Sibelius; his opera The Last Temptations has received over 500 performances worldwide, and is considered by many to be Finland's most distinguished national opera.

Life 
Joonas was born in Iisalmi, Finland, but spent the latter part of his life in Järvenpää at his home, which was known as Villa Kokkonen, designed by Alvar Aalto and finished in 1969. He served in the Finnish army during World War II with great distinction. He received his education at the University of Helsinki, and later at the Sibelius Academy, where he afterwards taught composition; his students there included Aulis Sallinen. In addition to his activities as a composer, he made a significant and powerful impact on Finnish cultural life, serving as a chairman and organizer, heading organizations such as Society of Finnish Composers, the Board of the Concert Centre, and others. His purpose was always to improve music education, as well as the status and appreciation of classical music as well as Finnish music. In the 1960s and early 1970s he won numerous prizes for his work. He was appointed to the prestigious Finnish Academy upon the death of Uuno Klami. His composition activity slowed down greatly after the death of his wife and increased alcohol consumption. He had long planned a Fifth Symphony but nothing was ever committed to paper and it died with him.

The date of his death has been variously reported as October 1, 1996 (New Grove Dictionary, and various internet sources); October 2, 1996 (many internet sources, including the Finnish Music Center); and October 20, 1996 (New Grove Dictionary of Opera). According to his biographer Pekka Hako, he died on October 2, in the early hours of the day.

Music and influence 
Even though he studied at the Sibelius Academy, he was mainly self-taught in composition. Usually his compositions are divided into three style periods: a neo-classical early style from 1948 to 1958, a relatively short middle period twelve-tone style from 1959 to 1966, and a late "neo-Romantic" style of free tonality which also used aspects of his earlier style periods, which began in 1967 and lasted for the rest of his life.

Most of his early music is chamber music, and includes a Piano Trio and a Piano Quintet; the style is contrapuntal and influenced by Bartók, but looks back to Renaissance and Baroque models as well. In the second style period he wrote the first two of his four symphonies. Although he used twelve-tone technique, he avoided orthodoxy by occasionally using triads and octaves; he also liked to use the row melodically, giving the successive pitches in the same tone color (many other composers of 12-tone music split the row between different voices).

In the third style period Kokkonen wrote the music that made him internationally famous: the last two symphonies, the ...durch einen Spiegel for twelve solo strings, the Requiem, and the opera The Last Temptations (1975) (Viimeiset kiusaukset), based on the life and death of the Finnish Revivalist preacher Paavo Ruotsalainen. The opera is punctuated with chorales which refer back to Johann Sebastian Bach, and which are also reminiscent of the African-American spirituals used for a similar purpose in Michael Tippett's oratorio A Child of Our Time.
The opera was staged at the Metropolitan Opera in New York in 1983.

List of compositions

Orchestral
Music for String Orchestra (1957)
Symphony No. 1 (1960)
Symphony No. 2 (1960–61)
Opus Sonorum (1964)
Symphony No. 3 (1967)
Symphonic Sketches (1968)
Symphony No. 4 (1971)
Inauguratio (1971)
"...durch einem Spiegel" (1977)
Il passagio (1987)

Concertante
Concerto for Cello & Orchestra (1969)

Chamber
Piano Trio (1948)
Piano Quintet (1951–53)
Duo for violin & piano (1955)
String Quartet No. 1 (1959)
Sinfonia da camera (1961–62)
String Quartet No. 2 (1966)
Wind Quintet (1973)
Sonata for Cello & Piano (1975–76)
String Quartet No. 3 (1976)
Improvisazione for violin & piano (1982)

Piano
Impromptu for piano (1938)
Pielavesi Suite for piano (1939)
Two Small Preludes for piano (1943)
Sonatina for piano (1953)
Religioso for piano (1956)
Bagatelles for piano (1969)

Organ
Lux aeterna for organ (1974)
Hääsoitto (Wedding music) for organ
Iuxta Crucem for organ
Surusoitto (Funeral Music) for organ

Vocal
Three Songs to Poems by Einari Vuorela (1947)
Illat Song Cycle (1955)
Three Children's Christmas Songs (1956–58)
Hades of the Birds Song Cycle for Soprano & Orchestra (1959)
Two Monologues from "The Last Temptations" for bass & orchestra (1975)

Choral
Missa a capella (1963)
Laudatio Domini (1966)
Erekhteion, academic cantata (1970)
Ukko-Paavon Virsi for chorus (1978)
Requiem (1979–81)
"With his fingers Väinämöinen played" for male chorus (1985)

Opera
The Last Temptations (1972–1975)

References

Further reading
 Arni, Erkki: "Joonas Kokkonen", Grove Music Online. Ed. L. Macy. (Accessed February 27, 2005.) (subscription access)
 The Last Temptations: opera by Joonas Kokkonen. Translated by Keith Bosley. 1977.
Hako, Pekka: Voiko varjo olla kirkas: Joonas Kokkosen elämä. [A biography of Joonas Kokkonen.] Ajatus Kirjat, Helsinki 2001. 
Jurkowski, Edward: The Music of Joonas Kokkonen. Ashgate Publishing Co., Burlington (VT) 2004.

External links
 Short biography with some description of his works
 Finnish Music Information Centre biography
 Fennica Gehrman's Kokkonen page (publisher)
 Ondine's Kokkonen page (record label)
 Swedish record company BIS website

1921 births
1996 deaths
People from Iisalmi
Finnish classical composers
20th-century classical composers
Finnish opera composers
Male opera composers
University of Helsinki alumni
Finnish military personnel of World War II
Finnish male classical composers
20th-century male musicians
20th-century Finnish composers